Wade H. Hammond (1879–1957) was an American musician who became one of the first African American bandmasters in the United States military in 1909, for the 9th Cavalry. He later also served as bandmaster for the 10th Cavalry and 25th Infantry. Hammond received his B.A. from Alabama A&M College, and then studied at the Royal Military School of Music of England. He also taught at both Alabama A&M and Western University.

Later in life, he organized the Urban League of Phoenix, Arizona, and became a member of the National Association of Housing Officials and the Phoenix Housing Authority. He also established the first band at Phoenix's Carver High School.

References

Notes

American bandleaders
1879 births
1957 deaths
American conductors (music)
American male conductors (music)
20th-century African-American musicians
Alabama A&M University faculty